Anthreptes is a genus of birds in the sunbird family, Nectariniidae.

Species
The genus contains 15 species:

References

External links 

 
Bird genera
Taxa named by William John Swainson
Taxonomy articles created by Polbot